Osaka Prefectural Kaifukan High School() is a public secondary school located in Habikino, Osaka, Japan. 

The school is located in the site of former Habikino High School.

The school name Kaifukan (懐風館) implies respecting the precursors' advice grounded on the history and the ethos of the local area, which is associated with the ancient history and culture of Japan e.g. Furuichi kofungun. The school emblem was designed after the tachibana and two birds flying abreast. The tachibana is a symbol for Habikino City. The birds imply Habikino City itself as well as the two predecessor schools.

History 
This section will explain not only the history of Kaifukan High School but that of Habikino High School and Nishiura High School, which are its predecessors.

The project office for Habikino High School was founded in 1970. The school was open in 1971 and had a full-time general course. In 1978, Nishiura High school opened in Nishiura of Habikino City, and had a full-time general course as well.

In 2007 the board of education of Osaka Prefecture announced the policy that both Habikino High School and Nishiura High School would be integrated to become a new high school with general selection system. The new school named Kaifukan High School was open in 2009. Both Habikino High School and Nishiura High School stopped accepting applications accordingly, and were closed in March 2011, when the last generation students were to graduate.

Timeline 
 April 1971 – Osaka Prefectural Habikino High School was open.
 April 1978 – Osaka Prefectural Nishiura High School was open.
 April 2009 – Osaka Prefectural Kaifukan High School was open. Both Habikino High School and Nishiura High School stopped accepting applications accordingly.
March 2011 – Both Habikino High School and Nishiura High School  were closed.

Curriculum 
As of 2017 the school offers two professional courses including sports youth leaders course and child care leaders course as well as three other courses including humanities course, science course and medical course. The freshmen need to take the common curriculum, and the sophomores are required to choose one of the five courses. Any course is designed to help the students to go up to higher education or to get a job.

Lawsuit over hair dyeing 
In 2017 a 18-year-old female student of Kaifukan High School sued the prefecture at Osaka District Court, stating that she suffered mental pain after she had been forced to dye her hair black by the school, seeking the compensation for her damages.  She claims that she was bullied by the educators under the guidance.

According to the lawsuit, the school forced her to dye her hair black repeatedly on the grounds of the school regulations, even though her mother had told the school beforehand that the student's hair is naturally-brown.  She had been forced to dye her hair frequently since her entrance, and as a result her skin and hair was damaged.  In addition an educator insulted her merely because she was brought up in a fatherless family. The school forbid her to attend the classes as well as school trip and school festival, blaming her for not dyeing her hair black adequately. In April 2017, the school removed her name from the list of the students arbitrarily and neglected to assign her seating in the classroom. She has not attended the class since September 2016.

The prefecture is asking the court to reject the claim, stating that some of the claim is contrary to the fact. Both the prefecture and the school refused to comment on the case. The head teacher did not declare whether "dyeing one's brown hair black" is a breach of the regulation or not, which prohibits the students from coloring or bleaching their hair. Meanwhile the student claims that the school told her mother, "even an oversea student with natural fair hair would be required to dye his/her hair black in accordance with the rule".

Notable alumni 
Alumni of former Habikino High School are listed.
 Kensaku Tennichi – a basketball coach of Nishinomiya Storks
  – a racer of Kyōtei, professional hydroplane racing
  – Mayor of Matsubara City

Access 
 13 minutes' walk from Komagatani Station on Minami Osaka Line

See also 
 List of high schools in Japan

Notes

References

External links 
 Official Homepage of Osaka Prefectural Kaifukan High School 

2009 establishments in Japan
Educational institutions established in 2009
High schools in Osaka Prefecture
Education in Osaka Prefecture